The Tarkani or Tarkalani are a Pashtun tribe mainly settled in Bajaur Agency, Lower Dir district of Pakistan but originally hailed from the Laghman province of modern-day Afghanistan.

The Tarkani is split into four clans. These include Mamund (Kakazai and Wur), Salarzai, Isazai, and Ismailzai.

References

Sarbani Pashtun tribes
Kunar Province
Bajaur Agency
People from Bajaur District
Ethnic groups in Laghman Province
Ethnic groups in Kunar Province